Tereza Bebarová is a Czech stage, television actress and voice artist.

Biography
She was born 8 July 1975 in Bohumín, Karviná District, Czechoslovakia. In childhood she liked singing and dancing. Bebarová studied Acting at the Conservatory in Ostrava. She has performed at the Petr Bezruč Theatre. She is the Czech voice of Jorja Fox, Evangeline Lilly, Nicole de Boer and Eva Longoria.

Theatre

Divadlo Na Fidlovačce
Le baruffe chiozzotte
Hamlet .... Ophelia
Our Town .... Emilie
Balada pro banditu .... Erzsika
Julie umírá každou noc .... Julie
Funny Girl .... Fanny Brice
My Fair Lady .... Elisa Doolitle

Filmography 
Doktor od jezera hrochů (2010)
Malé lži (2009
Poslední kouzlo (2006) (TV)
"Ulice" (2005) TV series .... Svetlana Lisechko (2007–2009)
Hypnóza (2004) (TV)
Stará láska nerezaví (2003 (TV)
Politik a herečka (2000) (TV)
Všichni moji blízcí (1999)
Průběžná Otrava krve (1997)
Konto separato (1996) (TV)

Episode role in TV series 
Strážce duší (2005) playing ??? in episode: "???" 2005
Zdivočelá země (1997) playing ??? in episode: "???"
Četnické humoresky (1997) playing Zofie in episode: "28"

References

External links 

Website Fidlovačka Theatre

1975 births
Living people
People from Bohumín
Czech stage actresses
Czech television actresses
Czech voice actresses
20th-century Czech actresses
21st-century Czech actresses
Recipients of the Thalia Award